The National Parks of Argentina make up a network of 35 national parks in Argentina. The parks cover a very varied set of terrains and biotopes, from Baritú National Park on the northern border with Bolivia to Tierra del Fuego National Park in the far south of the continent. The Administración de Parques Nacionales (National Parks Administration) is the agency that preserves and manages these national parks along with Natural monuments and National Reserves within the country.

The headquarters of the National  Service are in downtown Buenos Aires, on Santa Fe Avenue. A library and information centre are open to the public. The administration also covers the national monuments, such as the Jaramillo Petrified Forest, and natural and educational reserves.

History 
This formed the nucleus of a larger protected area in Patagonia around San Carlos de Bariloche. In 1934, a law was passed creating the National Parks system, formalising the protected area as the Nahuel Huapi National Park and creating the Iguazú National Park. Thus, Argentina was the third country in the Americas, after United States and Canada to establish a national parks system. The National Park Police Force was born, enforcing the new laws preventing tree-felling and hunting. Their early task was largely to establish national sovereignty over these disputed areas and to protect borders. Five further national parks were declared in 1937 in Patagonia and the service planned new towns and facilities to promote tourism and education. Six more were declared by 1970.

In 1970 a new law established new categories of protection: National Parks, National Monuments, Educational Reserves, and Natural Reserves. Three national parks were designated  in the 1970s. In 1980, another new law affirmed the status of national parks – this law is still in place. The 1980s saw the service reaching out to local communities and local government to help in the running and development of the national parks. Ten more national parks were created with local co-operation, sometimes at local instigation. In 2000, Mburucuyá and Copo National Parks were declared, and El Leoncito natural reserve was upgraded to a national park.

Map

National Parks

See also 
List of World Heritage Sites in Argentina
List of UNESCO Biosphere Reserves in Argentina

References

External links 

National Parks Administration (Spanish/English)

 
Argentina
National parks
National parks